Thorsten Schulz (born 5 December 1984) is a German footballer who plays as a right-back.

Career statistics

References

External links

1984 births
Living people
Association football fullbacks
German footballers
FC Energie Cottbus II players
SpVgg Unterhaching II players
SpVgg Unterhaching players
VfR Aalen players
Dynamo Dresden players
FC Erzgebirge Aue players
3. Liga players
People from Groß-Gerau
Sportspeople from Darmstadt (region)
Footballers from Hesse